Canadian-Romanian relations are the bilateral relations between the governments of Canada and Romania. Canada has an embassy in Bucharest. Romania has an embassy in Ottawa and three consulates-general (in Montreal, Toronto and Vancouver). Romania has also three honorary consulate general in Moncton, Québec and Calgary.

The two countries are members of Organization for Security and Co-operation in Europe, La Francophonie and NATO.

History 

Clifford Sifton visited Bukovina in 1895. From 1912 to 1913 Robert W. Service was a correspondent for the Toronto Star during the Balkan Wars. 

Joseph W. Boyle served the king and queen of Romania during the World War I, helping to protect the country from the Central Powers and to operate Romania's railways. He was awarded the special title of "Saviour of Romania" for these and many other deeds. He remained a close friend, and was at one time a possible lover of the Romanian Queen, British-born Marie of Edinburgh. 

The formal Canada-Romania diplomatic relationship goes back in 1919. Formal relations were established on August 16, 1919 when the General Consulate of Romania was established in Montreal by Vasile Stoica. Prior to that, the consulate had worked without the consent of Canadian authorities. 

Canadian general, diplomat and peacekeeper John de Chastelain was born in Bucharest to a Scottish father and an American mother. 

Bilateral relations at embassy level were initiated on April 3, 1967. Canada commissioned its first resident ambassador in Romania, Bruce MacGillivray Williams, in December 1967. The Embassy of Romania in Ottawa was opened in 1970. In 1991, the General Consulate of Romania started to operate in Toronto, while the General Consulate in Montreal regained its initial functions. 

The Ambassador of Canada in Bucharest is Kevin Hamilton (appointed June 2016). Romania's senior official in Ottawa currently is Mr. Bogdan Manoiu, Chargé d'affaires.

Trade relations 
Romania is Canada's largest trading partner in Southeast Europe. The flagship project for Canada is the Cernavodă Nuclear Power Plant established with Atomic Energy of Canada Limited (AECL). The first nuclear reactor has been in operation since 1996 and the official launch of the second nuclear reactor took place in 2007. AECL and its consortium partners have entered Romania's procurement process for the construction of reactors 3 and 4.

In 2012, bilateral trade between Canada and Romania reached (CAD) $387.5 million. The stock of Canadian investment in Romania was $273 million at the end of 2011. Canada has invested in mineral fuel exploration and automobile construction.

Bilateral treaties and agreements 

 Double Taxation Avoidance Agreement, which came into effect January 1, 2005.
 Social Security Agreement was signed on November 19, 2009.
 Other treaties cover: Extradition, Foreign Investment Protection, Fisheries, Legal Assistance in Criminal Matters, Nuclear Cooperation and Trade.

Gallery

See also 
 Foreign relations of Canada
 Foreign relations of Romania
 Canadians of Romanian descent
 Comprehensive Economic and Trade Agreement

External links 
   Canadian Foreign Affairs and International Trade Office about relations with Romania
  Romanian Ministry of Foreign Affairs about relations with Canada
 Canadian Embassy official site
 Official site of the Romanian Embassy

Notes 
 

 
Romania
Bilateral relations of Romania